Carl L. Johnson (September 12, 1898 – March 23, 1958) was an American politician, railroad employee, and farmer.

Johnsom was born in St. James, Minnesota and graduated from St. James High School. He lived in St. James, Minnesota with his wife and family. Johnson was a farmer and worked for the Omaha Railroad. Johnson served in the Minnesota House of Representatives in 1933 and 1934. He died in Saint Paul, Minnesota and his funeral was in St. James, Minnesota.

References

1898 births
1958 deaths
People from St. James, Minnesota
Farmers from Minnesota
Members of the Minnesota House of Representatives